Mount Cloos is a dome-shaped mountain probably over  high, standing at the north side of Girard Bay and  northeast of Cape Cloos, on the northwest coast of Kyiv Peninsula in Graham Land. It was discovered by the Belgian Antarctic Expedition of 1897–99 under Gerlache. It was named in association with Cape Cloos by the French Antarctic Expedition of 1908–10 under Jean-Baptiste Charcot.

References 

Mountains of Graham Land
Danco Coast